Thuwan Raheem (born 11 September 1979) is a Sri Lankan footballer who plays as a defender for Air Force Colombo and the Sri Lankan national team.

International career
Raheem made his senior international debut on 21 October 2007, playing in a 1–0 loss to Qatar in a first round match of the 2010 FIFA World Cup qualifiers (AFC).

External links

1979 births
Living people
Sri Lankan footballers
Sri Lanka international footballers
Association football defenders
Air Force SC players
Sri Lankan Malays
Sri Lankan Muslims
Sri Lanka Football Premier League players